Wila Salla (Aymara wila red, salla rocks, cliffs, "red rocks") is a  mountain in the Andes of Bolivia. It is located in the Potosí Department, Tomás Frías Province, on the border of the municipalities of Tinguipaya and Yocalla.

References 

Mountains of Potosí Department